The 1995 Citizen Cup doubles was a tennis event played on outdoor clay courts at the Am Rothenbaum in Hamburg in Germany that was part of Tier II of the 1995 WTA Tour. The 1995 Citizen Cup tournament was held from 1 May through 7 May 1995.

Jana Novotná and Arantxa Sánchez Vicario were the defending champions but only Novotná competed that year with Mary Pierce. Novotná and Pierce lost in the first round to Elena Makarova and Eugenia Maniokova. Gigi Fernández and Martina Hingis won in the final 6–2, 6–3 against Conchita Martínez and Patricia Tarabini.

Seeds
Champion seeds are indicated in bold text while text in italics indicates the round in which those seeds were eliminated.

 Meredith McGrath /  Larisa Savchenko (semifinals)
 Julie Halard /  Brenda Schultz (first round)
 Conchita Martínez /  Patricia Tarabini (final)
 Kristie Boogert /  Nicole Muns-Jagerman (quarterfinals)

Draw

External links
 ITF tournament edition details

1995 WTA Tour